Geißler is a river of Lower Franconia, Bavaria, Germany. It is a left tributary of the Lauer near Stadtlauringen.

See also
List of rivers of Bavaria

References

Rivers of Bavaria
Rivers of Germany